The Monumento a los caídos en Malvinas is a cenotaph in Plaza San Martín, in Buenos Aires, dedicated to the 649 Argentine soldiers who were killed in the Falklands War. The inscription reads La nación también rinde homenaje a los que guardan en su cuerpo o memoria las huellas del combate.

See also 
 1982 Liberation Memorial

References 

 

Monuments and memorials in Buenos Aires
Aftermath of the Falklands War
Cenotaphs